Gyasi A. Zardes (born September 2, 1991) is an American professional soccer player who plays as a forward for Austin FC of Major League Soccer and the United States national team.

Born in Hawthorne, California, Zardes was part of the LA Galaxy youth academy before playing college soccer for Cal State Bakersfield. After playing three seasons with the Roadrunners, Zardes signed for the LA Galaxy as a homegrown player. In his first season, he immediately established himself as a regular in Bruce Arena's squad, and the next season he scored 16 goals as he helped the Galaxy win MLS Cup 2014. His performance for the Galaxy in 2014 helped earn Zardes his debut for the United States against Chile in January 2015.

Prior to the 2018 season, Zardes was traded to the Columbus Crew. He was an immediate starter for head coach Gregg Berhalter as he scored 19 goals in his first season with the Crew. Zardes would be named the MLS Comeback Player of the Year Award for 2018. In 2020, Zardes helped lead the Columbus Crew to their second MLS Cup, defeating the Seattle Sounders in the final.

Early life
Zardes was born and raised in Hawthorne, California, a suburb of Los Angeles. He was one of five children; his father Glenn is from New Orleans, while his mother Linda is from Michigan. In 2016, the City of Hawthorne unveiled a mural of Zardes at its new futsal courts, where a prohibition on soccer use was lifted.

Club career

Early career
Zardes played in the U.S. Soccer Development Academy for the Galaxy Academy U-18s during the 2008–09 and 2009–10 DA seasons as well as with the Galaxy U-20s in the 2009 USL Super-20 campaign.  After declaring himself a red shirt freshman at CSU Bakersfield, Zardes led the Galaxy U-20 team to the national championship in 2010.

After tallying five goals and a team-best seven assists in his first season of college soccer, Zardes burst onto the scene as a sophomore in 2011, scoring 18 times in 20 games while helping lead Bakersfield to a berth in the NCAA Division I Tournament for the first time in school history. His 18 goals that season were the fourth most in Division I college soccer that year and he was selected the Mountain Pacific Sports Federation Player of the Year and a semifinalist for the MAC Hermann Trophy, which is awarded annually to the top player in college soccer.

In 2012, Zardes followed up his breakout season by scoring 15 goals and adding nine assists, each of which were team-highs, in 17 games, while helping the Roadrunners record a winning record for the fourth consecutive season. He had two or more goals in four of his 17 games, including seven goals in a two-game stretch in mid-October.

LA Galaxy

LA Galaxy signed Zardes as a Homegrown Player on December 20, 2012. On April 15, 2013, Zardes made his debut as a substitute for LA Galaxy Reserves in a 1–1 draw with Seattle Sounders Reserves. On April 27, 2013, Zardes made his debut for the first-team as a substitute for the Galaxy in a 2–0 win over Real Salt Lake. On May 11, 2013, Zardes came on as a substitute in 67th min and scored his first goal for the Galaxy in a 3–1 loss against Vancouver Whitecaps. Zardes scored the only goal in a 1–0 victory over Chivas USA on June 23, 2013.

Zardes scored his first brace for the Galaxy against New England Revolution on July 16, 2014, in a 5–1 win.  On September 5, 2014, Gyasi Zardes scored two goals in the Galaxy's 6–0 home win against Colorado Rapids.  With his brace, Zardes made Major League Soccer history, passing Diego Fagúndez to become the highest scoring Homegrown Player in a single season.

On December 7, 2014, Zardes became the first Homegrown Player to score in the MLS Cup final. Zardes scored in the 53rd minute after receiving a cross from Stefan Ishizaki. In extra time, captain, Robbie Keane scored as Galaxy triumphs the New England Revolution 2–1, making LA Galaxy the first team to win the trophy five times. Zardes was the sixth highest scorer of the season with 16 goals, and just three behind Robbie Keane.

Columbus Crew
On January 20, 2018, Zardes signed for Columbus Crew SC in a swap deal that saw Ola Kamara head in the opposite direction. After an injury plagued end to his Galaxy career, Zardes found new life in Columbus; scoring 11 goals in the first 19 games of the season, narrowly missing out on the 2018 MLS All-Star Game. In response to Zardes missing the game, he garnered high praise from then Columbus coach Gregg Berhalter, who said “[a]bsolutely he should be,” “the work he does for the team has been outstanding. I think he’s one of the top strikers in the league.” Zardes ended the 2018 season with 19 goals, earning the 2018 MLS Comeback Player of the Year Award. On May 13, 2019, Zardes signed a multi-year contract extension with the Crew and was named a designated player. He would go on to tally 13 goals in 28 appearances during the 2019 season.

Colorado Rapids
On April 22, 2022, Zardes was traded to the Colorado Rapids in exchange for $300,000 in GAM with potential add-ons that could take the deal up to $1,400,000 GAM in total.

Austin FC
On December 12, 2022, Zardes signed a three-year contract on free agency deal with Austin FC starting from the 2023 season.

International career

After a breakout 2014 season in which he scored 19 goals across all competitions, he received his first ever international call up to represent the United States in January 2015, for matches against Chile and Panama. Zardes made his international debut on January 28, 2015, when he came on as a substitute for Clint Dempsey in the 68th minute against Chile. On February 8, 2015, Zardes made his first start for USMNT in a friendly against Panama, where he provided an assist to Dempsey in the second goal as the U.S. won 2–0.

On June 5, 2015, Zardes scored his first goal for the United States in a friendly against the Netherlands. Zardes was named to the 2015 CONCACAF Gold Cup roster and started in several matches, including a group stage fixture against Haiti where he provided the game-winning assist to Clint Dempsey one minute after coming on as a substitute at halftime. He scored his first international competitive goal on July 18, 2015, in the Gold Cup quarterfinals against Cuba that ended in a 6–0 victory for the United States.

Zardes was called up in the early stages of 2018 FIFA World Cup qualification for the U.S. and scored the fifth goal in a 6–1 victory over Saint Vincent and the Grenadines on November 13, 2015. He had been involved in conceding the first goal of the match to Saint Vincent and the Grenadines after a defensive error. Zardes was named to the U.S. roster for the 2016 Copa América Centenario and scored twice in a warm-up friendly against Bolivia on May 28. He scored the winning goal in the 2–1 quarterfinal match defeat of Ecuador in Seattle, finishing a shot by Clint Dempsey that was rolling towards the goal.

Zardes played in the 2017 CONCACAF Gold Cup and did not score in the tournament, instead providing an assist to Jordan Morris in a narrow 3–2 victory over Martinique in the group stage. His next international goal would come three years later in a friendly against Ecuador on March 21, 2019, which was won 1–0 by the United States. Zardes joined the U.S. in the 2019 CONCACAF Gold Cup and scored the third of four goals in the team's opening group stage match against Guyana. A shot by Paul Arriola was deflected by a Guyanese defender, hitting Zardes in his left eye before bouncing into the goal. In the next match against Trinidad and Tobago, Zardes scored twice in three minutes while the team reached the knockout stage with a 6–0 victory. Zardes was unable to complete his hat-trick, despite having several chances to do so, including a shot that hit the post.

Zardes scored the game winner in the semifinal match against Qatar in the 2021 CONCACAF Gold Cup in the 86th minute of play off of a cross from Nicholas Gioacchini.

Personal life
Born in the United States, Zardes is of Ghanaian descent. In 2013, Zardes married his long-term girlfriend Madison Goodvin, a fellow student-athlete in Bakersfield. They have four children. He is a practicing Christian and has a degree in criminal justice from Cal State Dominguez Hills.

Career statistics

Club

International

Scores and results list the United States' goal tally first.

Honors
LA Galaxy
MLS Cup: 2014

Columbus Crew
MLS Cup: 2020
Campeones Cup: 2021

United States
CONCACAF Gold Cup: 2017, 2021
CONCACAF Gold Cup: Runner up 2019

Individual
MLS All-Star: 2015
MLS Comeback Player of the Year Award: 2018

References

External links

 
 CSU Bakersfield player profile
 

1991 births
Living people
African-American Christians
Sportspeople from Hawthorne, California
Soccer players from California
African-American soccer players
American soccer players
American sportspeople of Ghanaian descent
Association football forwards
Cal State Bakersfield Roadrunners men's soccer players
Ventura County Fusion players
LA Galaxy players
LA Galaxy II players
Columbus Crew players
Colorado Rapids players
Colorado Rapids 2 players
Austin FC players
USL League Two players
Major League Soccer players
MLS Next Pro players
Designated Players (MLS)
Major League Soccer All-Stars
USL Championship players
United States men's international soccer players
2015 CONCACAF Gold Cup players
Copa América Centenario players
2017 CONCACAF Gold Cup players
2019 CONCACAF Gold Cup players
2021 CONCACAF Gold Cup players
CONCACAF Gold Cup-winning players
Homegrown Players (MLS)
21st-century African-American sportspeople